Microsphaeropsis is a genus of fungi belonging to the family Didymosphaeriaceae.

The genus has a cosmopolitan distribution.

Species
Microsphaeropsis amaranthi 
Microsphaeropsis amictus 
Microsphaeropsis arundinis 
Microsphaeropsis atrocylindrocollifera 
Microsphaeropsis bakeri 
Microsphaeropsis betulae 
Microsphaeropsis caffra 
Microsphaeropsis caloplacae 
Microsphaeropsis centaureae 
Microsphaeropsis cinnamomi-glanduliferi 
Microsphaeropsis clidemiae 
Microsphaeropsis conielloides 
Microsphaeropsis diffusa 
Microsphaeropsis ephedrina 
Microsphaeropsis globulosa 
Microsphaeropsis glumarum 
Microsphaeropsis glycyrrhizicola 
Microsphaeropsis hakeae 
Microsphaeropsis hellebori 
Microsphaeropsis heteropatellae 
Microsphaeropsis ixorae 
Microsphaeropsis lichenicola 
Microsphaeropsis maricae 
Microsphaeropsis miconiae 
Microsphaeropsis microstegium 
Microsphaeropsis naumovii 
Microsphaeropsis ochracea 
Microsphaeropsis olivacea 
Microsphaeropsis ononidicola 
Microsphaeropsis onychiuri 
Microsphaeropsis paliformis 
Microsphaeropsis physciae 
Microsphaeropsis pittospororum 
Microsphaeropsis proteae 
Microsphaeropsis pseudaspera 
Microsphaeropsis rugospora 
Microsphaeropsis sarcinellae 
Microsphaeropsis spartii-juncei 
Microsphaeropsis stellenboschensis 
Microsphaeropsis strychnotis 
Microsphaeropsis subcorticalis 
Microsphaeropsis tuisiensis 
Microsphaeropsis ulmicola 
Microsphaeropsis vagabunda 
Microsphaeropsis xerotis

References

Pleosporales
Dothideomycetes
Lichenicolous fungi
Taxa described in 1916
Taxa named by Hans Sydow
Taxa named by Paul Sydow